The Honda Indy Toronto is an annual Indy Car race, held in Toronto, Ontario, Canada. Originally known as the Molson Indy Toronto, it was part of the Champ Car World Series from 1986 to 2007. After a one-year hiatus, it has been part of the NTT IndyCar Series schedule since 2009. Toronto is classified as an FIA Grade Two circuit.

It is IndyCar's second-longest running street race, only behind the Grand Prix of Long Beach and is the third oldest race on the current schedule (tied with the Mid-Ohio 200) in terms of number of races run. The Toronto Indy is one of seven Canadian circuits to have held an IndyCar race, the others being Canadian Tire Motorsport Park, Mont-Tremblant, Sanair, Montreal, Vancouver, and Edmonton.

Origins
Motorsport and automobile demonstrations has a history at Exhibition Place going back over 100 years. Automotive shows, displays, races and driving demonstrations have taken place on the grounds since the invention of the automobile, including the first appearance of an indy car, the 1916 Indianapolis 500 winning Peugeot during the 1918 Canadian National Exhibition.

From 1952 until 1966 the grandstand hosted stock car racing on a paved quarter mile circuit on Friday nights and Sunday afternoons, hosting crowds upwards of 20,000 often broadcast live on CBC in Toronto. In 1958 the venue hosted a NASCAR Cup Series race, the Jim Mideon 500. The race was the first of Richard Petty's 1,184 starts in NASCAR and was won by his father Lee Petty.

In 1967, the first ever Indy race held in Canada was the Telegram Trophy 200, held at nearby Mosport Park in Bowmanville, Ontario as part of the USAC Championship Car season. The race was won by Bobby Unser for his first career Indy victory.  Following Dan Gurney’s victory in 1968, a group led by John Bassett and Imperial Tobacco made the first proposal to run both the 1969 Telegram Trophy Indy race and the Formula One Canadian Grand Prix at a new street circuit along Lake Shore Boulevard and through Exhibition Place with the start/finish line and pits to be located inside Exhibition Stadium. Bassett dropped the idea just as the bill was going through third reading before Toronto city council.

After a nine-year absence, IndyCars returned to the Toronto area for the Molson Diamond Indy at Mosport Park won by A. J. Foyt in 1977 and Danny Ongais in 1978.

Following the 1977 Formula One Canadian Grand Prix, Labatt, the sponsor who held the rights to F1 racing in Canada at the time, as well as the owners of Mosport Park revived the proposal to move the race to Exhibition Place after the FIA deemed Mosport as an unsuitable host facility going forward.  Toronto city council turned down the proposal by a margin of two votes and within a few hours, Montreal mayor Jean Drapeau had negotiated with Labatt to move the race permanently to Montreal.

In 1984, Molson Breweries in-house promotional division, Molstar Sports & Entertainment acquired the rights to CART sanctioned IndyCar races in Canada and ran the first Molson Indy at the Sanair Speedway outside Montreal. The tight tri-oval was unpopular with the CART teams in part due to a severe injury to Rick Mears during the first event. In the spring of 1985, Molson revived the idea of a street circuit through Exhibition Place in Toronto for a third time. Toronto City Council approved the race by two votes in July 1985 for the race to be held the following year.

Race history
The first Molson Indy Toronto was won by Bobby Rahal on July 20, 1986.  The event quickly became Canada's second largest annual sporting event, eclipsed only by the Canadian Grand Prix in Montreal, with three-day attendance figures routinely around 170,000 people.

In the 1996 race, American driver Jeff Krosnoff was killed in a crash with 4 laps remaining. In that same crash, volunteer corner marshal Gary Avrin was killed, and marshal Barbara Johnston also received injuries in the crash; she was treated and released that evening. Adrián Fernández won the race.

The name of the race was changed in 2006 from the Molson Indy Toronto to the Molson Grand Prix of Toronto after it was purchased by the Champ Car World Series from Molstar Sports and Entertainment. The name was also changed to distance Champ Car from the rival Indy Racing League (IRL), which had gained the exclusive right to use the "Indy" name after 2002. In 2007, after Molson dropped their title sponsorship to the race, Steelback Brewery signed a multi-year, multimillion-dollar deal to become the event's title sponsor, renaming it the Steelback Grand Prix of Toronto. This marked the first title sponsorship change since the event started in 1986.

The unification of Champ Car and the Indy Racing League was announced on February 22, 2008, and the Grand Prix of Toronto's future was left in doubt. After attempts were made to preserve the race for 2008, it was confirmed on March 5, 2008, that the race had been cancelled. On May 15, 2008, Andretti Green Racing (co-owned by Michael Andretti) purchased the assets of the former Grand Prix of Toronto. On July 30, 2008, it was confirmed that the race would return to Toronto on July 12, 2009. On September 18, 2008, Andretti Green Racing announced that it had signed a multi-year agreement with Honda Canada Inc. for the title sponsorship of the race, henceforth named from 2009 onward as the Honda Indy Toronto.

In 2013, the race weekend was changed to a 2 race format with one race Saturday and one race Sunday. The Saturday race would feature a standing start while the Sunday race would be a rolling start. After an aborted standing start Saturday leading to a rolling start, teams and officials agreed to try the standing start again Sunday. The Sunday standing start was successful on its first attempt and was the first successful standing start in unified IndyCar series history (the Champ Car World Series had used standing starts late in its history shortly before unification). In 2014, weather forced both races to be run Sunday, exposing the difficulty in logistics of running two races in an already packed schedule. By 2015, both standing starts and the two race format were abandoned.

In 2016, the track layout was modified to accommodate the newly constructed Hotel X Toronto. Under the new layout, the pit lane was moved to the opposite side of the race course, starting at the outside of turn 9 and exiting just after turn 11. This, in turn, made turn 11 a sharper turn than it had been in the previous configuration.

Michael Andretti is the all-time race win leader with seven victories.

The 2020 and 2021 editions of the event was cancelled due to the COVID-19 pandemic in Ontario, marking the second time in the race's history. This came due to the restrictions that were in place barring non-essential travel at the Canada-United States border (as most IndyCar Series races are within the United States) and after Mayor John Tory announced that all mass public gatherings were banned throughout the summers of 2020 and 2021 respectively in response to the pandemic.

Following the cancellation of the 2020 race, a new three-year agreement was reached in September 2020 between Exhibition Place and Green Savoree Toronto to host the event through 2023.

Past winners

USAC (Mosport Park)

1967:  Run in two heats of 98 miles (158 kilometers/40 laps) each. Second race stopped after 6 laps due to rain.
1968:  Run in two heats of 98 miles (158 kilometers/40 laps) each.

CART/Champ Car/IndyCar (Exhibition Place)

1990: Race shortened due to rain.
1996: Race shortened due to fatal crash involving Jeff Krosnoff and a track marshal.
2014 I: Race postponed from Saturday to Sunday morning due to rain. Shortened to accommodate regularly scheduled Sunday race.
2014 II: Race shortened due to time limit.

Support race winners

Road to Indy

SCCA Trans-Am Series

Pirelli World Challenge – GT

Pirelli World Challenge – Touring Car

CASCAR Super Series

NASCAR Pinty's Series
The Indy Toronto circuit is based around Exhibition Place, but the heritage of NASCAR and Exhibition Place dates considerably earlier than the 2010 Canadian Tire Series round at Indy Toronto.  In 1958, the 31st round of NASCAR's Grand National (now Cup Series) championship was held at the third Exhibition Stadium (located on the site of BMO Field). That race marked the Cup debut of Richard Petty.

Stadium Super Trucks

Lap Records
The official race lap records at the Grand Prix of Toronto (Exhibition Place) are listed as:

Current series
NTT IndyCar Series
USF Pro 2000 Championship
USF2000 Championship
NASCAR Pinty's Series
Sports Car Championship Canada
Radical Canada Cup
Blue Marble Radical Cup North America

Former series

Besides the main event, Honda Indy Toronto also holds races of lower levels before. These are known as support series. A variety of racing series have previously run as support series on the race weekend. These include:

Champ Car World Series 
Indy Lights
Atlantic Championship
Barber Dodge Pro Series
CASCAR Super Series
Trans-Am Series
Ferrari Challenge
North American Touring Car Championship
Canadian Touring Car Championship
Motorola Cup
IMSA GT3 Cup Challenge Canada
Porsche Carrera Cup North America
SPEED Energy Stadium Super Trucks
North American Fran Am 2000 Pro Championship
Canadian Formula Ford Championship
Pirelli World Challenge
Player's Ltd./GM Motorsport series
Honda Michelin Challenge Series
F1600 Super Series

Charities
During the tenure of Molson's original race ownership, the Molson Indy Festival Foundation hosted various fundraising events in the city in the week leading up to the race week. As of 2004 the foundation had donated $5.6 million towards community groups and charitable organizations.

In 2010 the race introduced the annual Fan Fridays to the race weekend. In lieu of paid admission, attendees are encouraged to make a contribution to the Make-A-Wish Foundation upon entering the grounds. The initiative has raised $820,000 as of 2019 for the organization dedicated to granting wishes for children with critical illnesses.

Race day attendance

See also
List of Indycar races
List of auto racing tracks in Canada
Annual events in Toronto

References

External links
Official website
Map and circuit history at RacingCircuits.info
2013 IndyCar Results Page
Exhibition Place (Toronto) race results at Racing-Reference

Auto races in Canada
 
Tourist attractions in Toronto
Festivals in Toronto
Articles containing video clips
Exhibition Place
1986 establishments in Ontario
Recurring sporting events established in 1986
IndyCar Series races
Champ Car races
NASCAR races
Annual events in Toronto